Ram Swaroop Sharma (10 June 1958 – 17 March 2021) was an Indian politician and a member of the Bharatiya Janata Party (BJP). He was elected to the Lok Sabha in 2014 and 2019.

Career
Born in Jogindernagar in the Mandi district of Himachal Pradesh. Sharma was the Organising Secretary of BJP (Mandi District) and was later elevated as Organizing Secretary of BJP (Himachal Pradesh). He also served as the Vice Chairman of the H.P. State Food and Civil Supplies Corporation.

He contested Mandi seat in 2014 Indian general election as BJP's candidate.

He won the Mandi seat in 2014 on BJP ticket beating Smt. Pratibha Singh of the INC by a margin of 39796 votes. The BJP swept the election in Himachal Pradesh winning all 4 Lok Sabha seats. He was re-elected in 2019.

Death 
He died on 17 March 2021 in New Delhi. He was found hanging in his room and the Delhi Police are investigating his death as a suicide.

References

|-

1959 births
2021 deaths
2021 suicides
India MPs 2014–2019
India MPs 2019–present
Bharatiya Janata Party politicians from Himachal Pradesh
Lok Sabha members from Himachal Pradesh
People from Jogindernagar
Politicians who committed suicide
Suicides by hanging in India